Giovanni Battista de Marinis (died 1669) was the Master of the Order of Preachers from 1650 to 1669.

Early Biography
Giovanni Battista de Marinis came from a noble family from Genoa.

Career
Marinis was appointed lector at the College of St. Thomas, the future Pontifical University of Saint Thomas Aquinas, Angelicum in Rome after 1624.

He was elected Master of the Dominican Order at the Chapter of 1650.

By order of Pope Urban VIII, he was not allowed to make any visitations, instead ruling the order by letter.  He tried to check the growing number of polemical writings between the Dominicans and the Jesuits.

He died in 1669.

References

1669 deaths
Italian Dominicans
Masters of the Order of Preachers
Year of birth unknown